Oxymeris chlorata, common name : the pink-spotted auger, is a species of sea snail, a marine gastropod mollusc in the family Terebridae, the auger snails.

Description
The shell size varies between 50 mm and 100 mm.

Distribution
This species occurs in the Indian Ocean off Chagos, Madagascar, the Mascarene Basin and Tanzania; in the Pacific Ocean off Pitcairn and Hawaii; also off Papua New Guinea.

References

 Bratcher T. & Cernohorsky W.O. (1987). Living terebras of the world. A monograph of the recent Terebridae of the world. American Malacologists, Melbourne, Florida & Burlington, Massachusetts. 240pp.
 Terryn Y. (2007). Terebridae: A Collectors Guide. Conchbooks & NaturalArt. 59pp + plates
 Severns, M. (2011). Shells of the Hawaiian Islands - The Sea Shells. Conchbooks, Hackenheim. 564 pp

External links
 
 Lamarck, (J.-B. M.) de. (1822). Histoire naturelle des animaux sans vertèbres. Tome septième. Paris: published by the Author, 711 pp
 Gray, J. E. (1834). Enumeration of the species of Terebra, with characters of many hitherto undescribed. Proceedings of the Zoological Society of London. (1834) 2: 59-63.
 Fedosov, A. E.; Malcolm, G.; Terryn, Y.; Gorson, J.; Modica, M. V.; Holford, M.; Puillandre, N. (2020). Phylogenetic classification of the family Terebridae (Neogastropoda: Conoidea). Journal of Molluscan Studies. 85(4): 359-388

Terebridae
Gastropods described in 1822